Obercunnersdorf is a former municipality in the district Görlitz, in Saxony, Germany. With effect from 1 January 2013, it has merged with Eibau and Niedercunnersdorf, forming the new municipality of Kottmar.

References 

Former municipalities in Saxony
Populated places in Görlitz (district)